

The Aerocar II Aero-Plane was an unusual light aircraft flown in the United States in 1964. It was developed from designer Moulton Taylor's Aerocar roadable aircraft, but could not be driven as a road vehicle. It used the wings and tail designed for the Aerocar, with a new fibreglass cabin. Excluding the parts needed for road operation allowed two more passengers to be carried. Only a single example was built.

Specifications (Aerocar Aero-Plane)

See also
Related development: 
Aerocar I
Aerocar III

References

External links
aerofiles.com

1960s United States civil utility aircraft
Aero-Plane
Aircraft first flown in 1964
High-wing aircraft
Single-engined pusher aircraft